Our Twenty For is the second single album by South Korean boy group Winner. It's their second comeback in 2017, after releasing their first single album Fate Number For in April, and the second in a series of music releases related to the number four. The single symbolizes Winner's youth, passion, and special friendship. It also symbolizes the average age of Winner members at 24 and their youth.

Background
On July 14, Winner's agency, YG Entertainment, confirmed that the group will return with new music, either in late July or early August, with music videos being filmed overseas in Hawaii, United States. On July 24, the agency confirmed the date of their comeback to be August 4 and the title of the single album "Our Twenty For". In the following days, they announced the two singles "Love Me Love Me" and "Island", which was written and produced by the group members with the help of YG producers Future Bounce and Bekuh BOOM.

Composition
"Love Me Love Me" is a disco song with a catchy hook, while "Island" is a tropical house track, which talks about romantic feelings with the unique theme of "island" and interesting lyrics.

Track listing

Charts

Release history

References

External links 

 
 

2017 albums
Genie Music albums
Korean-language albums
Single albums
Winner (band) albums
YG Entertainment albums